Sarria or Sarrià may refer to:

Sarrià, Barcelona, a neighbourhood in Barcelona, Catalonia, Spain
Sarrià-Sant Gervasi, the Barcelona district containing Sarrià
Sarrià Stadium, a former football stadium in Sarrià, Barcelona
Sarrià (Barcelona Metro), a station of the Barcelona Metro
Callosa d'en Sarrià, a municipality in the Valencian Community
Sarrià de Ter, a municipality  in Girona, Catalonia, Spain
Sarria, a municipality in the province of Lugo, Galicia, Spain
Sarria (comarca), a comarca in the province of Lugo, Galicia, Spain